This is a list of songs recorded by the British girl group Sugababes.

Songs

See also
Sugababes discography

Notes

References

British music-related lists
Lists of songs recorded by British artists